Heinz Meier could refer to:

Heinz Meier (actor) (1930-2013), German actor and theatre director
Heinz Meier (bobsledder), Swiss bobsledder
Heinz Meier (composer) (1925-1998), German composer who used the pseudonym "Henry Mayer"
Heinz Meier (water polo) (born 1912), Swiss Olympic water polo player

See also
Henry Mayer (disambiguation)